Leiarius marmoratus, commonly as Sailfin Pim or Achara Catfish, is a species of demersal catfish of the family Pimelodidae that is native to Amazon and Orinoco river basins.

Description
It grows to a length of 100.0 cm.

References

External links
INDUCTION OF ESPERMIATION IN YAQUE Leiarius marmoratus

Pimelodidae
Catfish of South America
Fish described in 1841